Peak Vale is a rural locality split between the Isaac Region and the Central Highlands Region, Queensland, Australia.

History 
On 17 May 2019, it was decided to discontinue the locality of Mistake Creek and absorb its land into the neighbouring localities of Clermont, Laglan, Frankfield and Peak Vale and to extend Peak Vale into the Central Highlands Region by altering the boundaries of Argyll.

References 

Isaac Region
Localities in Queensland